Tshakhuma Dam is an embankment dam near Tshakhuma in Limpopo, South Africa. It was completed in 1990 and supplies water to the Tshakhuma Irrigation scheme.

References

Dams in South Africa
Buildings and structures in Limpopo
Dams completed in 1990
Embankment dams